Arising Realm is the second studio album by Norwegian black metal band Ragnarok. It was released in 1997 through Head Not Found.
Shagrath, most famous as a member of Dimmu Borgir, occasionally appears on this album, playing synthesizers.

Track listing

Personnel

Ragnarok
Thyme: Vocal
Rym: Guitars
Jerv: Bass
Jontho P.: Drums

Additional Personnel
Shagrath: Keyboards, Synthesizers

References

1997 albums
Ragnarok (Norwegian band) albums
Head Not Found albums